The 1992 Speedway World Team Cup was the 33rd edition of the FIM Speedway World Team Cup to determine the team world champions.

The final was staged at the Kumla Speedway in Kumla, Sweden. The United States won their third title.

Qualification

Group D
 April 20, 1992
  Marmande
 ROUND 1

 May 3, 1992
  Ljubljana
 ROUND 2

Austria to Group C.

Group C

 May 10, 1992
  Leszno
 ROUND 1

 May 31, 1992
  Seinäjoki
 ROUND 2

Poland  to Group B.

Group B

 July 21, 1992
  Elgane
 ROUND 1

 July 27, 1992
  Landshut
 ROUND 2

Group A

 September 6, 1992
  King's Lynn

Great Britain to Final.

World Final
 September 19, 1992
  Kumla, Kumla Speedway

See also
 1992 Individual Speedway World Championship
 1992 Speedway World Pairs Championship

References

Speedway World Team Cup
1992 in speedway